Mwanza Alliance is a team that plays in the Tanzanian First Division League. It is owned by the Alliance Schools in Mwanza. In the 2016/2017 they finished second behind Singida United F.C. and failed to achieve promotion into the Tanzanian Premier League.

Football clubs in Tanzania